Kaash is an 1987 Bollywood film written and directed by Mahesh Bhatt. It is produced by the comedian Mehmood's brother Anwar Ali. Like several other 1980s films by Mahesh Bhatt, Kaash, was described as a semi-art film and upon release, received critical acclaim. Arshad Warsi made his film debut as an assistant director to Bhatt with this film.

Plot
Ritesh (Jackie Shroff), a popular film star and his wife Pooja (Dimple Kapadia) live a wealthy lifestyle with their seven-year-old child Romi. However, after a series of unexpected box office failures and huge losses, he is hounded by creditors and consequently, the couple sell all their personal property and belongings. Frustrated and embittered by his career dive, Ritesh becomes an alcoholic. Pooja, who takes it upon herself to look after the family, works several jobs. This leads to continuous differences between the two, and Romi, their child, becomes a silent spectator to their constant fights and disputes at home.

One day, in a hotel where Pooja works as a chambermaid, she is molested by a hoodlum. A stranger called Alok (Anupam Kher) saves Pooja from him and offers her a job in his firm, much to the annoyance of Ritesh, who would prefer that she stay at home. Ritesh feels it is the last straw for him. He asks Pooja to choose between her job and her family and house. She leaves. Ritesh wins Romi's custody, but soon discovers that Romi is going to die from brain cancer.

To sustain their child's happiness and to take care of him, Ritesh and Pooja agree to reunite and spend time together, fulfilling all his wishes before he passes away. Thrown together under the shadow of their child's upcoming death, Ritesh and Pooja, in experiencing the traumatic ordeal, rediscover themselves and each other.

Cast

Jackie Shroff as Ritesh
Dimple Kapadia as Pooja
Master Makrand as Romi
Anupam Kher as Alok
Dalip Tahil as Vijay
Mukri as Municipal Dog Catcher
Satish Kaushik as Jagan (Special Appearance)
Mehmood as Jin (Special Appearance)

Crew
 Producer: Anwar Ali, F.K. Rattonsey
 Director: Mahesh Bhatt
 Story: Mahesh Bhatt
 Screenplay: Suraj Sanim
 Dialogues: Suraj Sanim
 Lyrics: Faruq Qaiser
 Music: Rajesh Roshan
 Choreography: Saroj Khan
 Editing: Waman Bhonsle
 Costume Design: Bhanu Athaiya

Music 

The soundtrack of the film contains 5 songs. The music is composed by Rajesh Roshan, with lyrics authored by Faruq Qaiser. The film was one of last playback singing appearances by Kishore Kumar before his death.

Reception
The film received positive reviews from critics. The direction, storyline and performances were lavishly praised. Film critic Akshay Shah from Planet Bollywood wrote, 
Shah wrote of Jackie Shroff and Dimple Kapadia's performances that, "Jackie as the alcoholic, frustrated and angry husband and father in the first half is perfect and in the second half as the kind and caring father is even better. His performance here is heart rending and it rates alongside Gardish and Parinda as one of his best performances... Dimple Kapadia has always been an actress of substance and she pulls of this role with élan and ease... It is Jackie and Dimple which make this film such a classic."

Mahesh Bhatt's directing was also received positively: "He is a master at emotional scenes as he has proven time and time again and extracts the best performances from his leading stars. Emotion ultimately is what makes Kaash a delight for viewing and a must see film."

In a 2000 article reviewing the last two decades in Hindi cinema, Bhawana Somaaya from The Hindu wrote, "Kaash... consolidates Mahesh Bhatt's position in the industry as a director to reckon with... The film recognises Dimple Kapadia and Jackie Shroff as performing artistes." M.L. Dhawan from The Tribune, while documenting the famous Hindi films of 1987, described the film as "a sensitive and sentimental melodrama", further noting that "Jackie and Dimple gave intense performances that were straight from the heart."

Pritish Nandy, editor of The Illustrated Weekly of India, was critical of the film, calling it Bhatt's "lousiest film", but he praised the performances, noting Shroff for his "powerful performance" and writing of Kapadia, "Dimple achieves the impossible. Bereft of her glitzy make-up, glamour and filmi mannerisms, she comes alive as never before: beautiful, sensitive, intense. You almost feel you've discovered a new actress on the screen."

References

External links

1987 films
Indian drama films
1980s Hindi-language films
Indian films about cancer
Films directed by Mahesh Bhatt
Films scored by Rajesh Roshan
1987 drama films
Hindi-language drama films